Yerzhan Shynkeyev (born 4 March 1985 in Karaganda, Kazakh SSR, Soviet Union) is a Kazakhstani judoka. He competed at the 2012 Summer Olympics in the +100 kg event.

References

External links
 
 

1985 births
Living people
Kazakhstani male judoka
Olympic judoka of Kazakhstan
Judoka at the 2012 Summer Olympics
Sportspeople from Karaganda
Asian Games medalists in judo
Judoka at the 2010 Asian Games
Judoka at the 2014 Asian Games
Asian Games silver medalists for Kazakhstan
Universiade medalists in judo
Medalists at the 2014 Asian Games
Universiade bronze medalists for Kazakhstan
Medalists at the 2009 Summer Universiade
20th-century Kazakhstani people
21st-century Kazakhstani people